Hamasa is an area in the Buraimi area in Oman on the Oman–United Arab Emirates border. Hamasa, for the period of 200 years, was the capital of the Buraimi district.

History
Being part of the region of Tawam or Al-Buraimi Oasis, Hamasa's history dates back thousands of years, and in 2015 was the site of archaeological investigations undertaken by Sultan Qaboos University, the Omani Ministry of Heritage & Culture and Zayed University. It was described by the explorer Wilfred Thesiger as being involved in the slave trade when he visited in the 1940s.

Al kandaq fort
The Al Kandaq fort is an ancient fort located in Hamasa. The fort is believed to have been built in the pre-islamic era. It is being maintained by the government since 1994. The fort is a local tourist attraction. It is situated just 755m away from the Hamasa border crossing station connecting Al-Buraimi to Al-Ain.

See also
 Al-Buraimi
 Al Qabil
 Mahdah
 Sunaynah

References

 
Oman–United Arab Emirates border crossings